Kurucz is a Hungarian surname. Notable people with the surname include:

Ivett Kurucz (born 1994), Hungarian handballer
Péter Kurucz (born 1988), Hungarian footballer
Tom Kurucz (born  1947), American football coach

See also
Kuruc

Hungarian-language surnames